Sheila or Sheilah Martin may refer to:

 Sheila Ann Martin (born 1943), a Canadian politician
 Sheila Judith Martin (born 1947), a Branch Davidian
 Sheilah L. Martin, a Canadian supreme court justice

Human name disambiguation pages